Civic Forum may refer to:

Civic Forum, a defunct political movement in Czechoslovakia
Civic Forum (Central African Republic), a defunct political party in the Central African Republic
Civic Forum for Northern Ireland, a consultative forum in Northern Ireland
Guinean Civic Forum–Social Democracy, a political party in Guinea-Bissau